Manafwa is a town in the Eastern Region of Uganda. It is the largest town in Manafwa District and the site of the district headquarters.

Location
The coordinates of Manafwa Town are 0°55'11.0"N, 34°17'28.0"E (Latitude:0.919723; Longitude:34.291099). The town is located within Mount Elgon National Park and is surrounded by tropical mountainous terrain.

Population
The national population census in 2002 put the town population at about 11,740. In 2010, the Uganda Bureau of Statistics (UBOS) estimated the population at 15,400. In 2011, UBOS estimated the mid-year population at 15,800.

In 2015, UBOS estimated the population of the town at 14,200. In 2020, the population agency estimate the mid-year population of Manafwa Town Council at 16,000. Of these, 8,200 (51.2 percent were female) and 7.800 (48.8 percent) were male. UBOS calculated that the town's population grew at an average rate of 2.4 percent annually, between 2015 and 2020.

Points of interest
The following additional points of interest lie within the town limits or near the edges of town:

1. The offices of Manafwa Town Council

2. Manafwa Central Market

3. A mobile branch of PostBank Uganda

4. Manafwa River, immediately south of town

5. Stanbic Bank Uganda Limited maintains a branch in Manafwa town.

See also
Manafwa District
List of cities and towns in Uganda

References

External links
Profile of Manafwa District Local Government

Populated places in Eastern Region, Uganda
Manafwa District
Bugisu sub-region